Paul Hawkins may refer to:

 Paul Hawkins (racing driver) (1937–1969), Australian racing car driver
 Paul Hawkins (politician) (1912–2002), British Conservative politician
 Paul Hawkins (musician), UK singer-songwriter associated with London's antifolk scene
 Paul Hawkins (mathematician), UK mathematician who co-invented the Hawk-Eye system for tracking balls in cricket and tennis
 Paul Hawkins (humourist) (born 1987), UK author of comedy books

See also
Paul Hawken, environmentalist, entrepreneur and author